"Any Girl" is a song by the American hip hop recording artist Lloyd Banks, the second single released from his third album, H.F.M. 2 (The Hunger for More 2) (2010). The song features the American R&B singer Lloyd and was produced by Dready. It was released as a digital download on June 8, 2010.

Background
The song was initially titled "Got 'Em Like" and the hook was originally sung by Banks himself. In an interview, Lloyd said of working with Banks,
"There was no hesitation on my part because we never had direct issues... We met for the first time in the studio and everything just clicked. It felt like it was our 10th song together. This refers to the rivalry between G-Unit, which Lloyd Banks is signed to, and Murder Inc., to which he was formerly signed.

After signing his new deal with EMI Group, EMI Label Services' began promoting "Any Girl" at urban and rhythmic radio formats in North America.

Music video
The music video, which was directed by J. Jesses Smith, was filmed on July 28, 2010, in Long Island and released on August 15, 2010. The video's concept of was inspired by the 1997 comedy film, Def Jam's How to Be a Player. It has cameo appearances from Banks' G-Unit colleagues Tony Yayo and 50 Cent, and the  model and actress, Marica Linn.

Charts

Release information

References

External links
Lloyd Banks featuring Lloyd - Any Girl music video

2010 singles
2010 songs
Lloyd Banks songs
Lloyd (singer) songs
Songs written by Lloyd Banks
G-Unit Records singles
EMI Records singles
Songs written by Lloyd (singer)